Absalom (English pronunciation , ; Biblical Greek ) is a masculine first name from the Old Testament, where Absalom is a son of King David.

The variant 
is used as the name of the father-in-law of Rehoboam in 1 Kings (15:2,10), who in 2 Chronicles 11:20,21 is referred to by the shorter form Avshalom. The modern Scandinavian first name, Axel has developed (via Axelen) from Absalon, a 12th-century  Danish archbishop and statesman. The variant Absolon is a German surname.

The name was also used in medieval England (variants Absolon, Apsolon, Abselon). As in the biblical story, as Absalom was pursuing his father, King David, in the forest of Ephraim and has his long hair caught in a tree, the name appears to have been a nickname for a man with long or thick hair, as suggested by a passage in the Canterbury Tales,

This use as a nickname is  possibly also the origin of Absalom as an English surname. The name Absalom continued to be used in Anglo-Saxon Protestantism in the 18th and 19th centuries.

The Hebrew name was used among Palestinian Jews in the 19th to early 20th century and remains current in Israel; it is mostly anglicized as Avshalom, reflecting Modern Hebrew pronunciation.

First name 

Absalom
 Absalom (c. 100 BC), a son of Jewish High Priest John Hyrcanus
 Absalom Shade Allan (1843 – after 1901), Canadian merchant and politician
 Absalom Baird (1824–1905), Union Army general in the American Civil War
 Absalom Boston (1785–1855), American businessman and captain
 Absalom Harris Chappell (1801–1878), American politician and lawyer
 Absalom Dlamini (born 1984), Swazi footballer
 Absalom Themba Dlamini (born 1950), former Prime Minister of Eswatini
 Absalom Greeley (1823–1885), Canadian politician
 Absalom J. Hembree (1813–1856), American soldier and politician
 Absalom Iimbondi (born 1991), Namibian footballer
 Absalom Jones (1746–1818), African American abolitionist and clergyman
 Absalom Jordan (1840–1888), American Civil War soldier
 Absalom Koiner (1824–1920), American lawyer and politician
 Absalom Willis Robertson (1887–1971), American politician
 Absalom Shabangu (born 1952), Swazi weightlifter
 Absalom Shade (c. 1793 – 1862), Canadian businessman and politician
 Absalom Sydenstricker (1852–1931), American Presbyterian missionary
 Absalom Tatom (1742–1802), American politician
 Absalom Austin Townsend (1810–1888), early pioneer of SW Wisconsin and founder of Rough and Ready, CA.  WI state politician.
 Absalom Watkin (1787–1861), English political reformer
 Absalom Holbrook Wingo, known as Al Wingo (1898–1964), American baseball player

Absalon/Absolon
 Absalon (c. 1128 – 1201), a Danish archbishop and statesman
 Absolon Stumme (died 1499), German painter

Avishalom/Avshalom
 Avishalom, the father-in-law of King Rehoboam of Judah
 Avshalom Elitzur (born 1957), Israeli physicist and philosopher
 Avshalom Feinberg (1889–1917), Jewish spy for Britain in World War I
 Avshalom Haviv (1926–1947), one of the Olei Hagardom
 Avshalom Kor (born 1950), Israeli linguist
 Avshalom Vilan (born 1951), Israeli politician and economist

Surname 

"Absalom" is a rare English surname, recorded as early as in the early 13th century. It derives from the first name Absalom which became popular in England in the 12th century. The surname remained rare throughout its existence, but it gave rise to a number of variants, such as Asplen, and via the latter Aspling and Ashplant.

The variant Absolon is found in England as well as in France and Germany, reaching Central Europe in the late medieval period, so that Absolon (feminine Absolonová) is now also a Czech and Slovak surname.

Absalom
 Henry W.L. Absalom, a member of the Scientific Committee on the Commonwealth Trans-Antarctic Expedition of 1955–58, eponymous of Mount Absalom in Antarctica.
 Jack Absalom (1927–2019), Australian artist
 Mike Absalom (born 1940), English folk singer-songwriter
 Ted Absolom (born 1875), Australian rules footballer.
 Joe Absolom (1978), English film actor

Absolon
 John Absolon (1815–1895), British watercolor painter
 Karel Absolon (1877–1960), Czech archaeologist, geographer, paleontologist, and speleologist
 Andrea Absolonová (1976–2004), Czech diver, and pornographic actress known as Lea De Mae
 Milada Absolonová, Czechoslovak slalom canoeist
 Monika Absolonová (born 27 1976), Czech singer and actress
 Philip Absolon (born 1960), British artist and a founder member of the Stuckists

References

See also 
 
 
 
 

Given names of Hebrew language origin
English masculine given names
Surnames of English origin